Michelle Jonathan Benítez Valenzuela (born 12 February 1996) is a Mexican professional footballer who plays as a winger for Tapatío on loan from Guadalajara.

Career

Youth
Benítez started his career with small club in his hometown of Sinaloa. From 2011-2013 he played for Águilas de la UAS. He then joined Guadalajara's youth academy in 2013. He arrived to Chivas Youth Academy going through U-17 and U-20. Until finally reaching the first team, Matías Almeyda being the coach promoting Benítez to first team.

Guadalajara
Michelle Benítez  made his official debut under Argentine coach Matias Almeyda in the Liga MX which was on March 4, 2017. He was subbed in at 46 minute against Toluca which ended in a 0-0 draw.

Honours
Guadalajara
Liga MX: Clausura 2017
Copa MX: Clausura 2017
CONCACAF Champions League: 2018

References

External links
 
 

1996 births
Living people
People from Culiacán
Association football fullbacks
Mexican footballers
C.D. Guadalajara footballers
Club Atlético Zacatepec players
Liga MX players